Patricia Strenius (born  in Karlskrona) is a Swedish weightlifter. She won the bronze medal in the women's 71kg event at the 2021 World Weightlifting Championships held in Tashkent, Uzbekistan.

Strenius competed at the women's 69 kg event at the 2018 European Weightlifting Championships in Bucharest, Romania, winning a silver medal in the snatch competition (99 kg), a gold medal at the clean and jerk competition (131 kg) and a gold medal in the total score (230 kg). The last time Sweden had a European weightlifting champion was in 1949, when Arvid Andersson won the title. Strenius also set a new Swedish and Nordic record with the 131 kg lift at the Clean & Jerk competition. The lift total of 230 kg is also a new Swedish record.

She represented Sweden at the 2020 Summer Olympics in Tokyo, Japan. She competed in the women's 76 kg event.

During the Olympics in Tokyo 2021, she managed to place 4th with a snatch of 102 kg on her 3rd attempt, and 133 kg in the clean and jerk. She did make an attempt at 138 kg but failed. Her score resulted in placing 4th with a total score of 235 kg.

Major results

References

External links
 

1989 births
Living people
Swedish female weightlifters
European Weightlifting Championships medalists
World Weightlifting Championships medalists
Weightlifters at the 2020 Summer Olympics
Olympic weightlifters of Sweden
People from Karlskrona
Sportspeople from Blekinge County
21st-century Swedish women